Shadwell is an English surname.

Notable people with the name include:

Thomas Shadwell (c. 1642–1692), English poet and playwright
Lancelot Shadwell (1779–1850), British barrister and politician
Charles Shadwell (Royal Navy officer) (1814–1886), Commander-in-Chief, China Station
Charles Shadwell (priest) (1840–1910), jurisprudence lecturer at Oriel College, Oxford 
Francis Shadwell (1851–1915), English cricketer
Arthur Shadwell (1854–1936), British physician and writer
Lancelot Cayley Shadwell (1882–1963), English writer and lyricist
Charles Shadwell (musician) (1898–1979), British conductor and bandleader
Graham Shadwell (born 1968), English international bowls player